Bernardo Segura Rivera (born February 11, 1970 in San Mateo Atenco) is a Mexican race walker.
He is the current holder of the 20,000m World Record for Race Walking on a track with a time of 1:17:25.6. In the 2000 Olympic Games, Segura finished first the 20 km walk. However, he was disqualified by the judges while he was being congratulated by then president Ernesto Zedillo.

Achievements

External links
 
 
 

1970 births
Living people
Mexican male racewalkers
Athletes (track and field) at the 1996 Summer Olympics
Athletes (track and field) at the 2000 Summer Olympics
Athletes (track and field) at the 2004 Summer Olympics
Athletes (track and field) at the 1999 Pan American Games
Athletes (track and field) at the 2003 Pan American Games
Olympic athletes of Mexico
Sportspeople from the State of Mexico
People from San Mateo Atenco
Olympic bronze medalists in athletics (track and field)
Medalists at the 1996 Summer Olympics
Olympic bronze medalists for Mexico
Pan American Games medalists in athletics (track and field)
Pan American Games gold medalists for Mexico
Pan American Games silver medalists for Mexico
World Athletics record holders
Universiade medalists in athletics (track and field)
Goodwill Games medalists in athletics
Central American and Caribbean Games silver medalists for Mexico
Competitors at the 1998 Central American and Caribbean Games
Universiade bronze medalists for Mexico
World Athletics Race Walking Team Championships winners
Central American and Caribbean Games medalists in athletics
Medalists at the 1993 Summer Universiade
Competitors at the 1994 Goodwill Games
Medalists at the 1999 Pan American Games
Medalists at the 2003 Pan American Games
20th-century Mexican people
21st-century Mexican people